Harti, meaning "strong man", is a Somali clan family that is the part of the Darod clan. The major sub-clans include the Majeerteen, Dhulbahante, Warsangali, Tinle, Maganlabe, Kaptallah and Dishiishe, while other minor sub-clans consist of Kaskiqabe, Geesaguule and Liibaangashe.

The clan settles the apex of the Horn of Africa and its peripheries, and in the south, the clan settles on both sides of the Kenya-Somalia border.

Distribution

The extended formal name of the Harti clan is Saleh Abdi Mohamed Abdirahman bin Isma'il al-Jabarti. The primary homeland of the Harti is the state of Puntland in northeastern Somalia. The clan is well represented in the regions of Sool, Sanaag, Togdheer, Bari, Nugaal and Mudug. There is also a significant trading Harti community in the state of Jubaland particularly in the port city of Kismayo. In Ethiopia, they are well represented in the Dollo Zone, whilst they have a notable presence in the North Eastern Province of Kenya.

History

Northern Sultanates

The Majeerteen Sultanate (Migiurtinia) was founded in the mid-18th century. It rose to prominence the following century, under the reign of the resourceful Boqor (King) Osman Mahamuud. Centred in Aluula, it controlled much of northern and central Somalia in the 19th and early 20th centuries. The polity maintained a robust trading network, entered into treaties with foreign powers, and exerted strong centralized authority on the domestic front.

With the gradual extension of European colonial rule into northern Somalia, all three sultanates were annexed to Italian Somaliland and British Somaliland in the early 20th century.

Darawiish sultanate-emirate-chieftainship

The Darawiish, mostly hailed from the Dhulbahante and drew the majority of its followers from this clan; the four major Darawiish administrative divisions, i.e. Dooxato, Shiikhyaale, Golaweyne and Miinanle were near exclusively Dhulbahante. The Dhulbahante in Buuhodle were particularly the first and most persistent supporters of the Dervish chieftainship-emirate-sultanate. The poet Aadan Carab noted that the Dhulbahante experienced a genocide at the hands of European colonialists due to their Darawiish adherence, noting the Dhulbahante genocide in his poem Diidda Ama Yeella. The Dervish chieftainship-sultanate resisted colonial occupation, especially the British who were aided by other Somali clans.

Foundation of Puntland
In 1998, the Harti community convened at Garowe to discuss their political future. The conference lasted for a period of three months. Attended by the area's political elite, traditional elders (Issims), members of the business community, intellectuals and other civil society representatives, the autonomous Puntland State of Somalia was established to deliver services to the population, offer security, facilitate trade, and interact with domestic and international partners. Abdullahi Yusuf Ahmed served as the fledgling state's founding president.

Clan tree

There is no clear agreement on the clan and sub-clan structures and many lineages are omitted. The following listing is taken from the World Bank's Conflict in Somalia: Drivers and Dynamics from 2005 and the United Kingdom's Home Office publication, Somalia Assessment 2001.

Abdirahman bin Isma'il al-Jabarti (Daarood)
Mohamed Darod (Kabalah)
Abdi Mohamed (Kombe)
Saleh Abdi (Harti)
Mohamed Harti (Majeerteen)
Said Harti (Dhulbahante)
Mohamoud Harti (Warsangali)
Ahmed Harti (Dishiishe)
Abdirahman Harti (Kaskiqabe)
Geesaguule
 calas jidhxun dhulbahante darwiish

Notable Harti members

Commanders
Nuurxaashi Cali, commander of one of the two Garbo subdivisions, named after himself 
Jaamac Cudur, commander of a Garbo (Darawiish) subdivision
Osman Boss, commander of a Ragxun subdivision
Cabbane Sugulle, commander of Burcadde-Godwein, a Darawiish administrative division
Adan Ali Gurey, commander of Golaweyne
Ali Meggar, Darawiish naval commander
Suleiman Aden Galaydh, Darawiish commander at Cagaarweyne
Nur Hedik, commander of Dooxato (the Darawiish cavalry) who had a Shiikhyaale regiment named after him
Haji Yusuf Barre, commander of the biggest battle in Darawiish history, i.e. Jidbali; singlehanded defender of Taleh
Yusuf Agararan, Jama Siad, led most successful Darawiish raid since Dul Madoba
Ibraahin Xoorane, Darawiish commander who killed Richard Corfield
Axmed Aarey, Darawiish artillery commander who abetted Richard Corfield's death
Mohamed Abshir Muse, first commander of the Somali Police Force
Abdullahi Ahmed Irro, Somali General, founded the National Academy for Strategy.
Mohamed Adam Ahmed, former Chief of Staff of the Somali Armed Forces

Prime ministers & leaders

Suleiman Haglotosiye, SSC president
Cabbaas Xuseen, first prime minister of the Darawiish (1895 - 1900)
Xaashi Suni Fooyaan, peace-time prime minister of the Darawiish (1905-1906)
Ali Khalif Galaydh, Ex-Prime minister of Somalia and Khaatumo President.
Abdiweli Gaas, former Prime Minister of Somalia, current President of Puntland.
Abdullahi Yusuf Ahmed, former President of Somalia, President of Puntland and leader/co-founder of the Somali Salvation Democratic Front.
Faarax Sugulle, head of the Darawiish haroun
Sainab Ugas Yasin, First female parliamentarian of Puntland 1998-2008. Women’s inclusion to politics advocate. 
Indhosheel, former Khatumo president
Mohamed Abdi Hashi, President of Puntland, October 2004 – January 2005
Abdirashid Shermarke, first Prime Minister of Somalia, second President of Somalia (10 June 1967 until 16 October 1969)
Abdirizak Haji Hussein, former Prime Minister of Somalia (1964–1967), and former Secretary General of the Somali Youth League.
Omar Sharmarke, Prime Minister of Somalia, and son of Abdirashid Sharmarke
Abdirizak Jurile, Veteran politician and Former Somalia Minister of Planning, Head of numerous International agencies 
Mohamud Muse Hersi, third President of Puntland
Abdihakim Amey, former Puntland vice-president
Abdisamad Ali Shire, former Puntland vice-president
Ahmed Elmi Osman, vice-president of Puntland since 2019
Abdirahman Farole, former President of Puntland
Barkhad Ali Salah, first mayor of Bosaso
Mohamed Geedeeye, first mayor-representative of Caynabo for Garad Ali's USP party
Ibrahim Eid, first mayor-representative of Xudun for Garad Ali's USP party
Said Mohamed Rage, Founder of Puntland counter-piracy & maritime crimes authority

Enterprisers

Aadan Carab, poet who documented the Dhulbahante genocide at the hands of European colonialists during the Darawiish era
Afqarshe Ismail, former Darawiish spokesman-poet; and first person to die in an airstrike in Africa
Ismail Mire, Darwiish supreme commander, poet
Jama Biixi Kidin, last resident of Silsilad; Darawiish child prisoner
Guled Adan, reverse engineer of electric toys
Ali Awale, created Somalia's national anthem
Aw Jama, Somali scholar, historian and collector of oral literature of Somalia. He wrote the first authoritative study of Dervishes. 
Saado Ali Warsame, singer-songwriter and former MP in the Federal Parliament of Somalia.
Ali Dhuh, anti-darwiish poet.
Kiin Jama, Somali artist
Ali Haji Warsame, entrepreneur, former chief executive officer of Golis Telecom Somalia
Amina Mohamed, former chairman of the INM and the WTO's General Council, and the current Secretary for Foreign Affairs of Kenya.
Abdi Bile, Somalia's most decorated athlete with the most Somali national records
Mohamed Suleiman, first ethnic Somali to win an Olympic medal
Abdinasir Ali Hassan, chairman of Hass petroleum.
Abdi Holland, Somali artist.
Abdillahi Mohammed Ahmed (1926–1993), known as Qablan, former Under-Secretary of Finance
Farah Awl (1937–1991), writer
Fatima Jibrell founder of the Horn relief now known as ADESO.
Yaasiin Cismaan Keenadiid, traditional Somali linguist
Shire Haji Farah, entrepreneur, and Executive Committee Member of the Somali Business Council
Omar A. Ali, entrepreneur, accountant, financial consultant, philanthropist, and leading specialist on Islamic finance.
Osman Yusuf Kenadid, inventor of the Osmanya writing script
Mohammed Awale Liban, designed the flag of Somalia
Maxamed Daahir Afrax, novelist, playwright, journalist and scholar
Iman (Zara Mohamed Abdulmajid), a Somali-American fashion model, actress and entrepreneur. A pioneer in the ethnic-cosmetics market, she is also noted for her philanthropic work. She is the widow of English rock musician David Bowie.
Abdulqawi Yusuf, lawyer and judge at the International Court of Justice.
Ali A. Abdi, sociologist and educationist, professor of education and international development, the University of British Columbia.

Royalty

Diiriye Guure, head / sultan of Dhulbahante, a position that coalesced with the Dervish
Garad Jama Garad Ali, Traditional Clan Chief of Dhulbahante Clan.
Garad Mukhtar Garad Ali, Traditional Clan Chief.
Ugas Hassan Ugas Yasin, supreme traditional clan elder of Dishiishe/ nominal chief Ugas of Harti clans. 
Ali Yusuf Kenadid, last Sultan of the Sultanate of Hobyo
Gerad Hamar Gale second Sultan of the Warsangali Sultanate
Mohamoud Ali Shire (1897–1960), one the Warsangeli Sultanate chiefs
Ugas Yasin Ugas Abdurahman, Ugas of the Dishiishe sultanate of Bosaso
Yusuf Ali Kenadid, founder of the Sultanate of Hobyo
Osman Mahamuud, King of the Majeerteen Sultanate (mid-1800s – early 1900s)
Abdulkadir Isse Ahmed Salah, Sultan of the Ugaar Saleebaan of Majeerteen

Politicians

Bashe Mohamed Farah, Speaker of Somaliland House of Representative.
Ibraahim Guure, Khatumo lawmaker
Ali Jangali Somalia's minister of foreign affairs
Ahmed Gacmayare, former Information Minister for Khaatumo State
Abdirizak Jurile, Veteran Politician, Former Minister of Planning and In't Cooperations of Somalia. Former Minister of Postal cooperation of Somalia. Diplomat, Head of numerous UN organizations and professor.
Abdullahi Bile Noor, longest served Somali MP, State-Minister of Education and Higher learning of Somalia Government
Faisal Hassan, Canadian politician
Ali Abdi Aware, former Puntland State Minister of the Presidency for International relations and Social Affairs.
Asha Gelle Dirie, former Minister of Women Development and Family Affairs of Puntland; founder and executive director of TAG Foundation
Ayaan Hirsi Ali, the first Somali-born member of parliament of a European country, author and political activist[19]
Farah Ali Jama, former Minister of Finance of Puntland
Haji Bashir Ismail Yusuf, first President of Somali National Assembly; Minister of Health and Labor of Somalia (1966–67)
Barkhad Ali Salah, First Mayor For Bosaso. 
Hassan Abshir Farah, former Mogadishu mayor, Somalia ambassador to Japan and later to Germany, interior minister of Puntland
Hassan Ali Mire, first Minister of Education of the Somali Democratic Republic; former Chairman of the Somali Salvation Democratic Front (SSDF).
Hirsi Magan Isse, scholar and revolutionary leader with the Somali Salvation Democratic Front (SSDF).
Ilhan Omar, a Somali-American politician, currently a member of the Minnesota House of Representatives representing the 60B district. On November 6, 2018, Omar was elected to the United States House of Representatives for Minnesota's 5th congressional district. She was the first Somali member of congress and the second female Muslim to be elected (the first is Rashida Tlaib who will represent Michigan's 13th congressional district) She will be officially sworn into office on January 3, 2019.
Jama Ali Jama, Colonel in the Somali military and former President of Puntland
Mire Hagi Farah Mohamed, Somali Finance Minister 2004–2006, and former mayor of Kismayo
Mohamed Abdi Aware, Puntland judge and member of Supreme Judicial Council.
Mohammed Said Hersi Morgan, son-in-law of Siad Barre and minister of defense of Somalia
Said Mohamed Rage, founder of puntland counter-piracy authority
Saida Haji Bashir Ismail, former Somali Finance Vice-Minister in the TNG (2000–2004)
Yasin Haji Osman Sharmarke, leader and co-founder of the Somali Youth League
Omar Ismail Waberi, Chairman of Horcad party. FGS MP
Yusuf Mohamed Ismail, former Ambassador of Somalia to the United Nations Human Rights Office in Geneva
Yusuf Osman Samatar, politician

Notes

References

Darod
Somali clans
Somali clans in Ethiopia